Sphaeroderus canadensis is a species of ground beetle in the family Carabidae. It is found in North America.

Subspecies
These two subspecies belong to the species Sphaeroderus canadensis:
 Sphaeroderus canadensis canadensis Chaudoir, 1861
 Sphaeroderus canadensis lengi Darlington, 1933

References

Further reading

 

Carabinae
Articles created by Qbugbot
Beetles described in 1861